Midland/Huronia Airport  is located  south southwest of Midland, Ontario, Canada.

The Huronia Airport is co-owned by Tiny Township, Penetanguishene, and Midland

References

External links
Official site

Registered aerodromes in Ontario